The Italian American Museum of Cleveland (abbreviated as IAMCLE) is a museum in the Little Italy neighborhood of Cleveland, Ohio, emphasizing the heritage, history, identity, and traditions of the city's Italian American community. The museum was founded by veteran Cleveland judges Basil M. Russo and Deborah J. Nicastro on Columbus Day 2020. A soft opening to the public was held in July 2021, with an official grand opening on October 1, 2021. The museum is sponsored by the Italian Sons and Daughters of America (ISDA), and works in partnership with the Western Reserve Historical Society.

See also
 Cleveland Feast of the Assumption Festival

References

External links
 

Ethnic museums in Ohio
Museums in Cleveland
Italian-American museums
Historical society museums in Ohio
Italian-American culture in Cleveland